Spring Waters is a 1968 Czechoslovak film directed by Václav Krška. The film starred Josef Kemr.

References

External links
 Jarní vody at the Internet Movie Database

1968 films
Czechoslovak romantic drama films
1960s Czech-language films
Czech romantic drama films
Films based on works by Ivan Turgenev
1960s Czech films